The politics of Western Sahara take place in a framework of an area claimed by both the partially recognized Sahrawi Arab Democratic Republic and Morocco.

Occupied by Spain from 1884 to 1975, as Spanish Sahara, the territory has been listed with the United Nations as a case of incomplete decolonization since the 1960s, making it the last major territory to effectively remain a colony, according to the UN. The conflict is largely between the Kingdom of Morocco and the national liberation movement known as Polisario Front (Popular Front for the Liberation of the Saguia el-Hamra and Río de Oro), which in February 1976 formally proclaimed the Sahrawi Arab Democratic Republic (SADR), now basically administered by a government in exile in Tindouf, Algeria.

Following to the Madrid Accords, the territory was partitioned between Morocco and Mauritania in November 1975, with Morocco acquiring the northern two-thirds. Mauritania, under pressure from the POLISARIO guerrillas, abandoned all claims to its portion in August 1979, with Morocco moving to annex that sector shortly thereafter and has since asserted administrative control over the majority of the territory. A portion is administered by the SADR. The Sahrawi Arab Democratic Republic was seated as a member of the Organisation of African Unity in 1984, and was a founding member of the African Union. Guerrilla activities continued until a United Nations-monitored cease-fire was implemented September 6, 1991 via the mission MINURSO. The mission patrols the separation line between the two territories.

In 2003, the UN's envoy to the territory, James Baker, presented the Baker Plan, known as Baker II which would have given Western Sahara immediate autonomy as the Western Sahara Authority during a five-year transition period to prepare for a referendum, offering the inhabitants of the territory a choice between independence, autonomy within the Kingdom of Morocco, or complete integration with Morocco. POLISARIO has accepted the plan, but Morocco has rejected it. Previously in 2001, Baker had presented his framework plan, called Baker I, where the dispute would be finally solved through an autonomy within Moroccan sovereignty, but Algeria and the Polisario Front refused it. Algeria had proposed the partition of the territory instead.

Suffrage
The population under Moroccan control participates in countrywide and regional Moroccan elections. A referendum on independence or integration with Morocco was agreed upon by Morocco and the Polisario Front in 1991, but it has yet to take place.

The population under SADR control and in the Sahrawi refugee camps of Tindouf, Algeria, participates in elections to the Sahrawi Arab Democratic Republic.

See also
Foreign relations of Morocco#Western Sahara
Legal status of Western Sahara

References